The 2001 Northamptonshire County Council election took place on 7 June 2001 to elect members of Northamptonshire County Council, England. The whole council was up for election and the Labour Party retained overall control of the council, which it had held since 1993.

Division by Division Results by County Borough

 In order of number of votes with the winning candidate first

Corby Borough

Daventry District

East Northamptonshire District

Kettering Borough

Northampton Borough

South Northamptonshire District

Wellingborough Borough

c

References

2001 English local elections
2001
2000s in Northamptonshire